This is a list of Association football games played by the Denmark national football team between 1970 and 1979. During the 1970s, the Danish national team played 97 games, winning 35, drawing 19, and losing 43. In these games, they scored 140 goals, while conceding 152 to their opponents. The first game of the 1970s was the May 9, 1970, game against Poland, the 325th overall Danish national team game. The last game of the 1970s was the November 14, 1979, game against Spain, the 421st game of the Danish national team.

Key
ECQ – European Championship Qualifying match
F – Friendly match
NC - Nordic Football Championship match
OG - Olympic Games match
OGQ - Olympic Games Qualifying match
WCQ – World Cup Qualifying match

Games
Note that scores are written Denmark first

See also
List of Denmark national football team results
Denmark national football team statistics

Sources
Landsholdsdatabasen  at Danish Football Association
A-LANDSKAMPE - 1970 - 1979 at Haslund.info

1970s
1970 in Danish football
1971 in Danish football
1972 in Danish football
1973 in Danish football
1974 in Danish football
1975 in Danish football
1976 in Danish football
1977 in Danish football
1978 in Danish football
1979 in Danish football